Judge Higginbotham may refer to:

A. Leon Higginbotham Jr. (1928–1998), judge of the United States Court of Appeals for the Third Circuit
Patrick Higginbotham (born 1938), judge of the United States Court of Appeals for the Fifth Circuit
Paul B. Higginbotham (born 1954), judge of the Wisconsin Court of Appeals